The 1944 Pittsburgh Panthers football team represented the University of Pittsburgh in the 1944 college football season.  The team compiled a 4–5 record under head coach Clark Shaughnessy.

Schedule

References

Pittsburgh
Pittsburgh Panthers football seasons
Pittsburgh Panthers football